La Leyenda de La Hora (The Legend of the Hour) is a 1981 album by jazz pianist McCoy Tyner released on the Columbia label. It features performances by Tyner with alto saxophonist Paquito D'Rivera, tenor saxophonist Chico Freeman, trumpeter Marcus Belgrave, flautist Hubert Laws, vibraphonist  Bobby Hutcherson, bassist Avery Sharpe, drummer Ignacio Berroa and percussionist Daniel Ponce, plus a string section conducted by William Fischer.

Reception
The Allmusic review by Scott Yanow states "The music (five Tyner originals) is highly rhythmic and generally quite stimulating. A strong effort".

Track listing
All compositions by McCoy Tyner
 "La Vida Feliz (The Happy Life)" - 7:29
 "Ja'cara (A Serenade)" - 4:59
 "La Habana Sol" - 6:36
 "Walk Spirit, Talk Spirit" - 9:56
 "La Busca (The Search)" - 6:21

Personnel
McCoy Tyner: piano
Paquito D'Rivera: soprano saxophone, alto saxophone
Chico Freeman: tenor saxophone
Marcus Belgrave: trumpet, flugelhorn
Hubert Laws: flute
Bobby Hutcherson: vibraphone, marimba
Avery Sharpe: acoustic bass
Ignacio Berroa: drums
Daniel Ponce: percussion
Harold Kohan, John Blake, Karen Milne, Elliot Rosoff: violin
Jesse Levine, Julien Barber: viola
Kermit Moore, Jonathan Abramowitz: cello
William Fischer: conductor

References

McCoy Tyner albums
1981 albums
Columbia Records albums
Albums recorded at Van Gelder Studio